The Football League 100 Legends is a list of 100 great association football players who played part or all of their professional career in English Football League and Premier League football. The players were selected in 1998 by a panel of journalists, including veteran reporter Bryon Butler, and the list was intended to reflect the League's history by including players from throughout the preceding 99 seasons.  The Football League also announced plans for a gala dinner later in the season at which surviving legends would receive a specially commissioned award.

The list includes 34 players who began their playing careers before the Second World War, 37 who began their careers between the end of the war and 1980, and 29 whose professional careers began after that date.  At the time of the list's publication, six of the legends were still active, all playing in the Premier League.  The last of the players to play professionally was Ryan Giggs, who retired at the end of the 2013–14 season.  All 100 of the legends played in The Football League with the exception of Dennis Bergkamp, who did not begin playing in England until after the Premier League replaced the Football League as the highest level of the English football league system in 1992.

At the time of its announcement, the Football League chief executive Richard Scudamore stated that the list was "almost impossible to better"; however, contributors to the BBC News website thought differently, providing many alternative suggestions.

Legends

References

English football trophies and awards
Legends
Lists of association football players